DXC may refer to

 DXC Technology, a US-based company
 A subclass of the New Zealand DX class locomotive